Legends of the Lost and Found: New Greatest Stories Live is the second live album by the American singer/songwriter Harry Chapin, released in 1979 (see 1979 in music). It featured ten new songs plus live versions of six tracks from recent albums. The album was not released on CD until 2005 when the Chapin family acquired the rights to the music. The new version was remixed from the original multitrack recordings by Harry's son Josh (executive producer) and Chapin Foundation board member and archivist Jason Dermer (producer/engineer). While making every attempt to stay true to the original version's sound as mixed by Steve Chapin, the new release features a revised track order that better follows the progression and feel of a Harry Chapin concert from that time period, as well as vocals that, through modern technique, rely less on the overdubs that were used in the original.

Track listing

Charts and certifications

Charts

CD track listing

Disc 1:
"Old Folkie" – 4:51
"Stranger With the Melodies" – 7:06
"We Were Three" – 5:20
"Legends of the Lost and Found" – 4:12
"Flowers Are Red" – 5:08
"Pretzel Man" – 3:09
"Odd Job Man" – 5:16
"Tangled Up Puppet" – 4:37
"Get on With It" – 5:22
"If My Mary Were Here" – 4:51

Disc 2:
"Poor Damned Fool" – 4:27
"Copper" – 5:15
"The Day They Closed the Factory Down" – 5:47
"Mail Order Annie" – 5:44
"Corey's Coming" – 8:09
"You Are the Only Song/Circle" – 3:59

Personnel
Harry Chapin – guitar, vocals
Steven Chapin – piano, vocals
Howie Fields – drums
Kim Scholes – cello
Doug Walker – guitar, vocals
John Wallace – bass, vocals

References

Harry Chapin albums
1979 live albums
Elektra Records live albums